The 2007 Eastern League season began on approximately April 1 and the regular season ended on approximately September 1. 

The Akron Aeros defeated the Erie SeaWolves 3 games to 1 in the Southern Division Championship Series and the Trenton Thunder defeated the Portland Sea Dogs 3 games to 1 in the Northern Division Championship Series.  The Trenton Thunder defeated the Akron Aeros 3 games to 1 to win the Eastern League Championship Series.

Regular season

Standings

Key: Green shade indicates that team advanced to the playoffs • Bold indicates that team advanced to ELCS • Italics indicates that team won ELCS

Statistical league leaders

Batting leaders

Pitching leaders

Playoffs

Divisional Series

Northern Division
The Trenton Thunder defeated the Portland Sea Dogs in the Northern Division playoffs 3 games to 1.

Southern Division
The Akron Aeros defeated the Erie SeaWolves in the Southern Division playoffs 3 games to 1.

Championship Series
The Trenton Thunder defeated the Akron Aeros in the ELCS 3 games to 1.

References

External links
2007 Eastern League Review at thebaseballcube.com

Eastern League seasons